Benjamin Franklin Buchanan (October 4, 1857 – February 21, 1932) was an American lawyer and politician who served as the 21st Lieutenant Governor of Virginia from 1918 to 1922.

Early life and education
Buchanan was born October 4, 1857, in Smyth County, Virginia, and graduated from the University of Virginia in 1880. He also received an LL.B. from the University of Virginia in 1884.

Career
Buchanan practiced law in Marion and Abingdon. He also served as general counsel to the office of the United States comptroller of the currency from 1915 to 1921. He served several terms in the Senate of Virginia representing Smyth and Washington Counties, where he became one of the General Assembly's foremost authorities on taxation.

In 1917 Buchanan, a Democrat, won election as lieutenant governor of Virginia. He served from February 1, 1918, to February 1, 1922.

Death and legacy
Buchanan died of a heart attack on February 21, 1932, in Richmond, where he was attending a session of the General Assembly. He was buried in Round Hill Cemetery in Marion. In 1934 the General Assembly designated the road that became state highway 16 in Smyth County the B. F. Buchanan Highway.

Personal life
On March 2, 1887, Buchanan married Eleanor Fairman Sheffey. They had four sons and three daughters, including John Preston Buchanan, who succeeded Buchanan in the Senate.

References
 John T. Kneebone et al., eds., Dictionary of Virginia Biography (Richmond: The Library of Virginia, 1998–   ), 2:366–367.

External links

1857 births
1932 deaths
Democratic Party Virginia state senators
Lieutenant Governors of Virginia
University of Virginia alumni
People from Smyth County, Virginia
19th-century American lawyers
20th-century American lawyers
20th-century American politicians
Virginia lawyers
University of Virginia School of Law alumni
People from Marion, Virginia